Crow River may refer to:

Canada
Crow River (Ontario), a tributary of the Petawawa River
Crow River (British Columbia), a tributary of the Beaver River

New Zealand
Crow River (Canterbury), a tributary of the Waimakariri River
Crow River (West Coast), a tributary of the Karamea River

United States
Crow River (Michigan), a tributary of Lake Michigan
Crow River (Minnesota), a tributary of the Mississippi River
Crow River, Minnesota, an unincorporated community
Crow River Township, Stearns County, Minnesota